Hampstead Cemetery is a historic cemetery in West Hampstead, London, located at the upper extremity of the NW6 district. Despite the name, the cemetery is three-quarters of a mile from Hampstead Village, and bears a different postcode. It is jointly managed by Islington and Camden Cemetery Service and opens seven days a week, with closing times varying throughout the year.

Location and history

Hampstead Cemetery is situated on Fortune Green Road and is bordered on the northern side by the sports ground of University College School. A public footpath running from Hocroft Road to Fortune Green runs through the cemetery, effectively splitting it in two.

Hampstead Cemetery was consecrated by the Bishop of London and opened in November 1876. While there are no new grave spaces available, there is an area for cremated remains to the north of the cemetery, by the Fortune Green Road exit.

The cemetery has a pair of Gothic style mortuary chapels, both of which are Grade II listed buildings. The southern chapel was originally Anglican, and the northern non-conformist; they share a common porte-cochère. Currently, only the southern chapel is in use as an inter-faith place of worship. There is also an entry lodge made of Kentish Rag and Bath stone. The Heritage Lottery Fund has funded restoration work on the buildings.

A large number of Celtic crosses can be found in the area to the southwest of the chapel, marking the presence of several Scottish families. The northeastern corner has some notable examples of modern and Art Deco stonemasonry, in particular the Bianchi monument and the sculpted church organ in memory of Charles Barritt.

Notable burials

 Dorothea Baird, actress (wife of H.B. Irving, also buried in the same grave)
 Nigel Balchin, novelist
 Francis Barraud, painter (most notably of His Master's Voice)
 Lajos Biro, Hungarian novelist
 Dennis Brain, horn player
 Ann Dudin Brown, philanthropist and co-foundress of Westfield College
 Gladys Cooper, actress
 Ewan Christian, architect
 Alan Coren, journalist, writer and satirist
 William Randal Cremer, politician and pacifist
 Sebastian Ziani de Ferranti, engineer and inventor
 Frank Bernard Dicksee, Pre-Raphaelite painter
 Maurice Feild, painter
 Walter Field, painter
 Andrew Fisher, fifth Prime Minister of Australia
 Banister Fletcher (Senior), architectural historian, and his son Banister Fletcher, architect
 Gilbert Frankau, novelist
 Ronald Frankau, comedian and comedy partner of Tommy Handley
 Pamela Frankau, author
 Ronald Fraser, actor
 Walter Goodman, artist, author and illustrator
 Kate Greenaway, children's book illustrator
 John Hargrave, pacifist and social activist
 H. B. Irving, actor son of Sir Henry Irving
 William Stanley Jevons (1835–1882), British economist and logician
 Henry Arthur Jones, playwright
 Goscombe John, sculptor
 Tamara Karsavina, Russian Prima Ballerina
 John Kensit (1853–1902), English religious leader and polemicist
 Joseph Lister, discoverer of antiseptic treatment of wounds
 Marie Lloyd, music hall star
 Marie Lloyd Jr., entertainer and daughter of the above
 George Alexander Macfarren, composer and musicologist
 Gaetano Meo (1849–1925), artist's model for the Pre-Raphaelites, landscape painter, and craftsman in mosaic and stained glass
 Charlotte Mew, poet
 Grand Duke Michael Mikhailovich of Russia and his wife Countess Sophie von Merenberg, Countess de Torby
 Alan Moorehead, writer
 Agnes G. Murphy, writer
 Julia Neilson, actress wife of Fred Terry
 Tom O'Brien, politician
 Herbert Andrew Patey, flying ace and military hero
 Adam Pragier, Polish socialist, minister and writer
 Harry Randall (1857–1932), actor and comedian
 Paula Rego, Portuguese painter
 Robert Reid (Australian politician) merchant and member of the Victorian Legislative Council and Australian Senate
 Joseph Rotblat, Nobel Laureate
 Eustace Short, co-founder of Short Brothers
 Horace Short, aircraft pioneer
 Elliott Spiers, actor (played the role of "Marc" in the 1988 film Paperhouse)
 George Adolphus Storey, painter
 James W. Tate, composer
 Fred Terry, actor (younger brother of Ellen Terry)
 Dennis Neilson-Terry, actor son of Fred Terry and Julia Neilson
 Florence Kate Upton, creator of the Golliwog
 Valli Valli, musical comedy actress and silent film performer
 Victor Willing, painter
 Charles Wyndham, actor and theatre manager

War graves
There are buried in the cemetery 216 Commonwealth service personnel from the First World War and 44 from the Second, besides one Polish and one Czech serviceman from the latter war.  Those whose graves could not be marked by headstones are listed on a Screen Wall memorial near the north boundary, right of the main entrance.

Other notable monuments

The cemetery also contains several graves notable either from an architectural point of view or for the eccentric inscriptions they bear.

Architecture

The eastern part of the cemetery houses the so-called Bianchi Monument, a large triangular grave for the Gall family, executed in the finest Art Deco style by the Trieste-born sculptor Romeo Rathmann in 1937. The most prominent feature of the grave – a stylised sculpture of a female angel raising her hands to heaven – has become famous in its own right, and often adorns the covers of local guidebooks.

Similarly, the tomb of James Wilson ('Wilson Pasha'), Chief Engineer to the Egyptian Government (1875-1901), executed in red marble and also found in the eastern section, has a striking Egyptian look to it.

The monument built by the sculptor Sir William Goscombe John to his wife Marthe (d. 1923) was stolen from the cemetery in 2001 but later returned after being spotted at an auction a few months later. It was then moved to East Finchley Cemetery but was once more stolen from a storage area in autumn 2006. It has not been recovered.

Inscriptions

The cemetery contains more than one grave with humorous or bizarre inscriptions. On the main avenue of the eastern section can be seen the grave of John Kensit (died 1902), a religious protestor who was "struck down by the missile of an assassin in Birkenhead", actually a chisel thrown by a member of a crowd he was preaching to (the man was charged with manslaughter but later acquitted).

The following epitaph is carved on the tomb of Charles Cowper Ross, "a man of the theatre":
What will be said,When I am dead,Of what I used to do?They liked my smile?I failed with style?Or, more than likely, "Who?"

Flora and fauna

The cemetery has a large number of mature ash trees. Other trees include yew, sycamore, Norway maple, silver birch, Lombardy poplar, purple cherry-plum, willow and Swedish whitebeam.

There is a wildlife area in the north part of the eastern half of the cemetery. This has been planted with trees, shrubs and wild flowers especially attractive to wildlife, such as field maple, hazel, oak, oxeye daisy, common knapweed and bird's-foot-trefoil. This is where most of the site's butterflies are to be found, including small white, speckled wood, holly blue, meadow brown and small copper.

Birds recorded in the cemetery include jay, robin redbreast, green woodpecker, long-tailed tit, goldcrest, willow warbler and linnet. It is also home to the ubiquitous grey squirrel, as well as many species of fungi.

References

Further reading
 The Good Grave Guide to Hampstead Cemetery, Fortune Green, by Marianne Colloms and Dick Weindling, Camden History Society, 2000:

External links
 Hampstead Cemetery (LB Camden)
 

Cemeteries in London
Parks and open spaces in the London Borough of Camden
1876 establishments in England
Grade II listed churches in London
Anglican cemeteries in the United Kingdom
Commonwealth War Graves Commission cemeteries in England